Lewis Kieran Hall (born 8 September 2004) is an English professional footballer who plays as a left-back or midfielder for  club Chelsea.

Early life
Lewis Kieran Hall was born on 8 September 2004 in Slough, Berkshire.

Club career
Lewis starting playing football at Binfield FC Soccer School. Joining at under-eight level, Hall signed his first scholarship with Chelsea in the summer of 2021. A regular at both under-18 and under-23 level, Hall received his maiden call-up to the first-team in December 2021, featuring as an unused substitute in Chelsea's 2–0 away EFL Cup quarter-final tie against Brentford. Just over two weeks later, on 8 January 2022, he made his professional career debut during an FA Cup third round win against Chesterfield at Stamford Bridge providing an assist for the third goal. By starting against Chesterfield, Hall became the youngest player to start an FA Cup tie for Chelsea.

International career
Hall has represented England from under-15 to under-18 level.

On 21 September 2022, Hall made his England U19 debut during a 2–0 2023 UEFA European Under-19 Championship qualifying win over Montenegro in Denmark.

Personal life
Lewis is the younger brother of Chorley player, Connor Hall.

Career statistics

References

External links
Profile at the Chelsea F.C. website

2004 births
Living people
Sportspeople from Slough
Footballers from Berkshire
English footballers
Association football defenders
Association football midfielders
Chelsea F.C. players
Premier League players
England youth international footballers